Guitiriz  is a City Council known for its spa of mineral water in the Terra Chá Region, Province of Lugo in North-western Spain. Prior to 1950 the town was called Trasparga.

Parishes 
(also known as: "Parroquias")

 Becín
 Buriz
 Labrada
 Lagostelle
 Mariz
 As Negradas
 Parga
 Pedrafita
 Pígara
 Roca
 Trasparga
 Vilar
 Vilares de Parga

History and tourism 

Though the early settlers were of Celtic origin and the Romans knew about the therapeutic properties of the thermae, it was not till the arrival of the Suebi after the collapse of the Roman Empire that this Spa Town became really popular for the first time in the 6th century. The name "Guitiriz" is derived from "Witirici", the Latin genitive of Witiricus meaning "the place owned by Witiricus" (i.e.: Witiricus the Suebian warlord).

In the 14th century the entire Terra Chá Region (including Guitiriz and its capital Villalba) ended up as part of the domains of Fernán Pérez de Andrade whose family were to become the First Counts of Villalba during the reign of the Catholic Monarchs.

Amongst other remains in the area is a well conserved medieval fortification, the Castle of Parga, and a Gothic bridge.

See also
 Hot spring
 Sauna
 Thermae
 Mineral water
 Balneotherapy
 Hydrotherapy

References

External links 

  Web-site devoted to the Spa Town of Guitiriz in North-western Spain
  The Hespederia (i.e.: Chain of Hotels) in the Spa Town of Guitiriz
  Tower of the Andrade Counts of Villalba in the Terra Chá Region - Built at the very end of the Middle Ages 14th Century

Municipalities in the Province of Lugo